Face It may refer to:

"Face It", a song by Kansas from Vinyl Confessions, 1982
Face It (album), by Golden Earring, 1994
Face It Live '97, an album by John Norum, 1998
"Face It", a song by NF from Mansion, 2015
"Face it", a 2019 autobiographical book by rock singer Debbie Harry
Face It, vocalist with the Danish band Kaliber